This is a list of members of the Senate of Romania, elected following the 2016 Romanian legislative election.

References